The 1976 Tour de Suisse was the 40th edition of the Tour de Suisse cycle race and was held from 9 June to 18 June 1976. The race started and finished in Murten. The race was won by Hennie Kuiper of the TI–Raleigh team.

General classification

References

1976
Tour de Suisse
June 1976 sports events in Europe